Qassar al Qulayah Island is an island of Bahrain.

Administration
The island belongs to Muharraq Governorate.

Transportation
The island has some of the Bahrain Port facilities.

Image gallery

References 

Islands of Bahrain
Islands of the Persian Gulf